German submarine U-186 was a Type IXC/40 U-boat of Nazi Germany's Kriegsmarine built for service during World War II.
Her keel was laid down on 24 July 1941 by DeSchiMAG AG Weser in Bremen as yard number 1026. She was launched on 11 March 1942 and commissioned on 10 July with Korvettenkapitän Siegfried Hesemann in command.

The U-boat's service began with training as part of the 4th U-boat Flotilla. She then moved to the 10th flotilla on 1 January 1943 for operations. 
The submarine carried out two patrols and was a member of nine wolfpacks. She sank three ships totalling .

She was sunk by a British destroyer on 12 May 1943.

Design
German Type IXC/40 submarines were slightly larger than the original Type IXCs. U-186 had a displacement of  when at the surface and  while submerged. She had two shafts and two  propellers.

U-186 was fitted with six  torpedo tubes (four fitted at the bow and two at the stern), 22 torpedoes, one  SK C/32 naval gun, 180 rounds, and a  SK C/30 as well as a  C/30 anti-aircraft gun. The boat had a complement of forty-eight.

Service history

First patrol
U-186s first patrol took her from Kiel, across the North Sea and into the Atlantic Ocean through the gap between Iceland and the Faroe Islands. She sank Ocean Vagabond on 11 January 1943 south of Iceland. She arrived at Lorient in occupied France, on 5 March 1943.

Second patrol and loss
The boat departed Lorient on 17 April 1943. On 12 May she was sunk northwest of the Azores by depth charges dropped by the British destroyer . Fifty three men died. There were no survivors.

Wolfpacks
U-186 took part in nine wolfpacks, namely:
 Habicht (10 – 19 January 1943) 
 Haudegen (19 January - 2 February 1943) 
 Nordsturm (2 – 9 February 1943) 
 Haudegen (9 – 15 February 1943) 
 Taifun (15 – 20 February 1943) 
 Amsel (22 April - 3 May 1943) 
 Amsel 4 (3 – 6 May 1943) 
 Rhein (7 – 10 May 1943) 
 Elbe 2 (10 – 12 May 1943)

Summary of raiding history

See also
 Donald Macintyre (Royal Navy officer)

References

Bibliography

External links

World War II submarines of Germany
German Type IX submarines
1942 ships
U-boats commissioned in 1942
U-boats sunk in 1943
Ships built in Bremen (state)
Ships lost with all hands
U-boats sunk by depth charges
U-boats sunk by British warships
Maritime incidents in May 1943